Black Tern Bog State Natural Area is a Wisconsin Department of Natural Resources-designated State Natural Area featuring 20 acres (8 ha) of quaking sphagnum bog surrounding two small seepage lakes situated in a pitted outwash plain. The bog is rich in plant species, such as sundews, pitcher plant, bogbean, and bog rosemary, as well as three species of bog orchids: swamp pink, grass pink, and rose pogonia. The state-endangered bog rush (Juncus stygius) also grows here. Birds known to nest here include black tern, American bittern, killdeer, and mallards.

Location and access 
Access is via an unnamed dirt road off US Highway 51, north of the bog. The road wraps around the northern and eastern portions of the bog. It is also possible to park on the shoulder of US Highway 51, which passes along the western edge of the bog.

References

External links 
Black Tern Bog State Natural Area

Protected areas established in 1967
Protected areas of Vilas County, Wisconsin
State Natural Areas of Wisconsin
Bogs of Wisconsin
Landforms of Vilas County, Wisconsin
1967 establishments in Wisconsin